The California Botanic Garden (formerly the Rancho Santa Ana Botanic Garden) is a botanical garden in Claremont, California, in the United States, just south of the San Gabriel foothills. It contains some 70,000 native Californian plants, representing 2,000 native species, hybrids and cultivars. The seed bank has embryos for the thousands of rare plants.

The garden has an active research department, specializing in systematic botany and floristics. The  herbarium of Pomona College, housed at the garden, was transferred from the college in 1996. It holds over 1,200,000 specimens. The journal Aliso is published by the organization semiannually. The garden offers graduate degrees in botany through Claremont Graduate University.

The garden originated in 1927 when Susanna Bixby Bryant established a native garden on her rancho in Orange County. The garden relocated to Claremont in 1951. The facility, run by a non-profit organization, was open to the public with free admission for 58 years; in 2009 an admission fee was implemented. In 2019, the garden was renamed "California Botanic Garden" to better represent the contents of its collections.

See also
Bernard Field Station
John R. Rodman Arboretum in Claremont, California
List of California native plants
List of botanical gardens and arboretums in California
List of botanical gardens in the United States

References

Further reading

External links

Rancho Santa Ana Botanic Garden
Gallery
yorbalindahistory.org Developed by the Yorba Linda Public Library.  Includes a collection of historic magazine and newspaper articles and pamphlets about the garden.

Botanical gardens in California
Botanical research institutes
Claremont, California
Parks in Los Angeles County, California
Research institutes in California
San Gabriel Valley
Botanists active in California
Science and technology in Greater Los Angeles
1927 establishments in California
Research institutes established in 1927
Environmental organizations based in Los Angeles